Angel Locsin is a Filipino actress who has received various awards and nominations for her work in film and television. She began her acting career with a supporting role in the biographical drama Ping Lacson: Supercop (2000). Locsin had her breakthrough as the avian-human hybrid protagonist in the fantasy television show Mulawin (2004) and its 2005 film adaptation, for which she received a Box Office Entertainment Award for her roles. She followed this with starring roles in fantasy action shows, including Darna (2005), Majika (2006), and Asian Treasures (2007), for the latter of which she was nominated for a Star Award for Best Drama Actress. Locsin appeared in a 2007 episode of the anthology series Maalaala Mo Kaya playing a facially disfigured abuse victim, and earned a Star Award for Best Single Performance by an Actress for her role.

In 2008, Locsin played a fledgling werewolf in the supernatural drama series Lobo, for which she received an International Emmy Award nomination for Best Actress. Her leading roles in the television series Only You (2009) and Imortal (2010) each garnered her nominations for Best Actress in a Drama Series at the Star Awards. For playing a Japan-based courtesan in the star-crossed romantic drama In the Name of Love (2011), she won Movie Actress of the Year at the Box Office Entertainment and Star Awards. Critical success came with the drama One More Try (2012), in which she portrayed a single mother caring for her illness-stricken son. She won several awards, including a Box Office Entertainment, a FAMAS, a Luna, and a Star Award for Best Actress. The following year, she gained a Star Award nomination for Best Comedy Actress for the sitcom Toda Max.

For her portrayal of the title character in the drama series The Legal Wife (2014), Locsin was nominated for a Star Award for Best Drama Actress. She then starred in the comedy drama Everything About Her (2017) and earned a Best Supporting Actress win at the Asia-Pacific Film Festival. Her guest role in a 2017 episode of the anthology series Maalaala Mo Kaya won her a KBP Golden Dove Award for Best Actress. In 2019, Locsin played an indoctrinated military nurse in the spy-action thriller series The General's Daughter, for which she was awarded a Star Award for Best Drama Actress and a Box Office Entertainment Awards for TV Actress of the Year. In addition to her acting career, Locsin is known for her philanthropic efforts, for which she was named one of Asia's Heroes of Philanthropy by Forbes magazine.

Awards and nominations

Other accolades

Listicles

See also
 Angel Locsin filmography

Notes

References

External links
 

Locsin, Angel